Blackie and the Rodeo King was the third album released by Canadian singer-songwriter Willie P. Bennett and was released as an LP album by Posterity-Woodshed Records in 1979 (PWS-013).

"Blackie and the Rodeo King" would be the inspiration for the name of the band, Blackie & The Rodeo Kings, something of a Canadian folk/roots supergroup whose first album was a collection of new covers of Willie P. Bennett songs.

Bennett re-released the album in remastered form on compact disc in 2001 on his own label, Bnatural Music.  Digital remastering was done by Paul Riemens at the same facility the album was originally recorded: Grant Avenue Studios, Hamilton, Ontario.

Track listing

Side one

 "John Henry, The Gambler" -  2:25
 "Has Anyone Seen My Baby?"  -  5:40
 "Stardust" -  3:17
 "This Lonesome Feelin'"  -  3:54
 "Standin' by the Highway"  -  4:52
 "Blackie and the Rodeo King"  -  3:36

Side two

 "Ballad in Low "E"" -  2:58
 "For the Sake of a Dollar"  -  2:58
 "Summer Dreams, Winter Sleeps"  -  3:09
 "Pens and Paper"  - 4:26
 "Take My Own Advice"  -  2:05

All words and music by Willie P. Bennett, C&P 2001 Bnatural Music; except "Stardust" - by Carmichael, Parish.

Performers/Credits
Willie P. Bennett – vocals, harmonica, acoustic and electric guitars
Mike Gardner - electric bass
Mike Holder - pedal steel
Denis LePage - banjo
Steve Taylor - drums
Chris Whiteley - harmonica, acoustic guitar, trumpet
Ken Whiteley - piano, organ, electric guitar
David Zdriluk - acoustic bass
David Essig - mandolin, slide guitar
Produced by: David Essig and Willie P. Bennett
Recorded and mixed at: Grant Avenue Studios, Hamilton, Ontario
Recording Engineer: Bob Lanois
Mixing Engineers: David Essig and Bob Lanois

1979 albums
Willie P. Bennett albums